Chocolate is a food made from roasted and ground cacao seed kernels

Chocolate may also refer to:

Geography
 Chocolate, Mexico 
 Chocolate Hills, Bohol, Philippines 
 Chocolate Mountains (Arizona), United States
 Chocolate Mountains, California, United States

Arts, entertainment, and media

Films
 Chocolat (2000 film), a Hallström romantic drama film
 Chocklet, a 2001 Indian Tamil film starring Prashanth
 Chocolate (2005 film), a 2005 Indian Hindi film 
 Chocolate (2007 film), an Indian Malayalam film
 Chocolate (2008 film), a Thai martial arts film

Literature
 Chocolate, a 1922 novel by Alexander Tarasov-Rodionov

Music

Groups
 Chocolate (band), a Uruguayan musical group
 Hot Chocolate (band), a British soul band

Songs
 "Chocolate" (Jesse & Joy song)
 "Chocolate" (Kylie Minogue song)
 "Chocolate" (Snow Patrol song)
 "Chocolate" (The 1975 song)
 "Chocolate" (The Time song)
 "Chocolate (Choco Choco)", a 2004 song by Soul Control
 "Chocolate", a 2022 song by Quavo and Takeoff

Television
 "Chocolate" (Masters of Horror), an episode of Masters of Horror
 Kim Jung Eun's Chocolate, a music television program
 Chocolate (Malayalam TV series), a 2019 Indian Malayalam television series
 Chocolate (Tamil TV series), a 2019 Indian Tamil television series
 Chocolate (South Korean TV series), a 2019 South Korean television series

Brands and enterprises
 Chocolate Skateboards, a skateboard distribution company
 LG Chocolate, a series of mobile phones

Other uses
 Chocolate (color)
 Chocolate gourami, a fish

See also
 Chocolat (disambiguation)
 Chocolatey (software package manager), a software distribution system
 Military chocolate (disambiguation)